Breath Control: The History of the Human Beat Box (2002) is a documentary directed by filmmaker Joey Garfield. The film explores the world of beatboxing, a form of music using the human mouth, throat and diaphragm to generate sounds that are usually produced by machines. Over 30 practitioners of this art form discuss their techniques and the evolution of their craft.  The human beat box is one of the key elements in the development of Hip Hop culture, alongside DJing, Graffiti, Breakdancing, and MC-ing. Unfortunately, its contribution has been largely overlooked, as has the fun, expressive, human, and spontaneous dimension of Hip Hop that it represents. As the first documentary of its kind, Breath Control: The History of the Human Beat Box uses interview's, live performances, archival footage, and animation to bring to light this important and neglected ingredient of Hip Hop's identity .

With the help of Beat Box pioneers Doug E. Fresh, Wise, Biz Markie, and The Fat Boys, Breath Control traces this art form from its basic beat beginnings in the Eighties to its present-day multi-layered, polyrhythmatic figurehead's Rahzel and Skratch of the Hip Hop group The Roots. But Breath Control isn't limited to Hip Hop. Musician Zap Mama opens up the idea that human beat boxing is an art form practiced all over the world and has been refined by many different cultures. Breath Control is a half historical, half tutorial look at humans as actual instruments.

External links
iBeatBox.com

Breath Control @ Yahoo Movies
Breath Control @ Ghost Robot
Breath Control @ NY Times
Breath Control: The History of the Human Beat Box at Eye For Film
Breath Control: The History of the Human Beat Box at the Yahoo!Xtra Movies
Breath Control: The History of the Human Beat Box at Answers.com

2002 films
American documentary films
Beatboxing
Documentary films about hip hop music and musicians
2002 documentary films
2000s English-language films
2000s American films
English-language documentary films